Jung Ki-suck (born 9 March 1984), better known by his stage name Simon Dominic, is a South Korean hip hop recording artist. He debuted in 2009 as a member of the hip-hop duo Supreme Team, which disbanded in 2013. As a solo artist, he has released two studio albums: Simon Dominic Presents: SNL League Begins (2011) and Darkroom (2018), and two extended plays: Won & Only (2015) and No Open Flames (2019). 

In addition to rapping, Simon Dominic was the co-CEO of hip hop record label AOMG from 2014 to 2018. He was also a cast member on South Korean variety shows, including Show Me the Money 5 (2016) and I Live Alone (2018).

Career
Simon Dominic began rapping in the underground Korean hip hop scene in the early 2000s, using the stage name K-OUTA. He later changed his stage name, which is a combination of "Simon," Wesley Snipes' character in the movie Demolition Man, and "Dominic," his baptismal name.

He and rapper E Sens formed the hip hop duo Supreme Team in 2009. The group broke into the South Korean mainstream and won several major awards during their career, including Best New Male Group at the 2009 Mnet Asian Music Awards, and the Hip Hop Award at the 2010 Golden Disc Awards.

In 2011, Simon Dominic released his first solo album, Simon Dominic Presents: SNL League Begins. The album peaked at #2 on the Gaon Album Chart.

In 2013, Supreme Team disbanded, and Simon Dominic left his label, Amoeba Culture. The following year, he became co-CEO of hip hop artist Jay Park's new record label AOMG.

Simon Dominic released his first extended play, Won & Only, in 2015. The album's first single, "Simon Dominic," achieved an "all-kill," meaning that it reached #1 on all of South Korea's major real-time music charts. The single peaked at #2 on the weekly Gaon Digital Chart.

In 2016, he appeared on the rap competition TV show Show Me the Money 5 as a judge and producer alongside fellow AOMG artist Gray. Their team member, rapper Bewhy, was the show's winner.

In 2018, Simon Dominic released his second full-length album, Darkroom. Soon after, he resigned as co-CEO of AOMG, but remained signed to the label as a rapper.

Philanthropy 
On September 8, 2022, He donated  to help those recovering damage from Typhoon Hin Nam Noh through The Hope Bridge Korea Disaster Relief Association.

Discography

Studio albums

Extended play

Maxi single

Singles

Filmography

Television shows

Web shows

Music video appearances

Awards and nominations

References

External links
 
 

1984 births
Living people
South Korean hip hop singers
South Korean male rappers
South Korean television presenters
South Korean male television actors
South Korean hip hop record producers
People from Busan
21st-century South Korean  male singers